The Isepeolini are a tribe of apid bees.

Genera
Isepeolus
Melectoides

References
C. D. Michener (2000) The Bees of the World, Johns Hopkins University Press.

Apinae
Bee tribes